Women in the Ukrainian military have played active roles in the Revolution of Dignity, the war in Donbas, and the ongoing 2022 Russian invasion of Ukraine.

Since 2014, women have also been struggling against discrimination and for gender equality within the Armed Forces of Ukraine, with projects such as Invisible Battalion.

War in Donbas

2022 Russian invasion of Ukraine

Position

Discrimination

Invisible Battalion

In popular culture

See also 
 Women in Ukraine

References

Bibliography

External links 

Feminism in Ukraine
Ukrainian female military personnel
Women in Ukraine